The 8th TCA Awards were presented by the Television Critics Association. The ceremony was held on July 15, 1992, at the Century Plaza Hotel in Los Angeles, Calif.

Winners and nominees

Multiple nominations 
The following shows received multiple nominations:

References

External links
Official website
1992 TCA Awards at IMDb.com

1992 television awards
1992 in American television
TCA Awards ceremonies